Oko Aryee (born 18 January 1941) is a Ghanaian football manager.

Career
Aryee was the head coach of the Ghana women's national team at the 2003 FIFA Women's World Cup.

References

External links
 
 
 Oko Aryee at Soccerdonna.de 

1941 births
Living people
Ghanaian football managers
Women's association football managers
Ghana women's national football team managers
2003 FIFA Women's World Cup managers